Michael Eyssimont (born September 9, 1996) is an American professional ice hockey forward for the Tampa Bay Lightning of the National Hockey League (NHL). The Los Angeles Kings selected him in the fifth round, 142nd overall, of the 2016 NHL Entry Draft.

Early life
Eyssimont was born on September 9, 1996, in Littleton, Colorado, to George and Nancy Eyssimont. He began playing street hockey after being gifted a pair of rollerblades for his fifth birthday. He began playing ice hockey when he was eight and would continue playing roller hockey in the warmer months until he turned 13. Eyssimont spent his minor ice hockey career with the Colorado Thunderbirds of the Tier 1 Elite Hockey League. He led the league in scoring during the 2012–13 season with 48 goals and 43 assists in 40 games.

Playing career

Junior
After leaving the Thunderbirds, Eyssimont began his junior ice hockey career with the Fargo Force of the United States Hockey League (USHL). During the 2013–14 season, he scored 14 goals and 30 points in 58 games for Fargo. He followed this with 17 goals and 36 points during the 2014–15 season before a March 2015 trade to the Sioux Falls Stampede. After the trade, Eyssimont added another 13 points in 14 regular season games for Sioux Falls. He helped the Stampede capture the 2015 Clark Cup with a team-leading 16 points (seven goals and nine assists) in 19 postseason games.

Collegiate
Eyssimont committed to play college ice hockey for the St. Cloud State Huskies while he was still playing for the Thunderbirds. Joining the team for the 2015–16 college hockey season, Eyssimont recorded his first NCAA Division I goal on October 31, 2015, when St. Cloud State defeated the Miami RedHawks 3-1. In January, Eyssimont scored three goals in the North Star College Cup and was named the tournament's most valuable player. He was also named the National Collegiate Hockey Conference (NCHC) Offensive Player of the Week and the NCAA Hockey #2 Star of the Week for his performance in the tournament. Eyssimont's North Star performance was part of a month in which he had 14 points in 10 games, and he was named the NCHC Rookie of the Month for his performance. Eyssimont scored the game-winning goal in St. Cloud State's 3–1 defeat of the Minnesota Duluth Bulldogs at the 2016 NCHC Tournament, giving the Huskies their first ever tournament championship. He was named both the NCHC Frozen Faceoff MVP and a member of the All-Tournament team. The Huskies then advanced to the 2016 NCAA Division I Men's Ice Hockey Tournament, where they were eliminated by Ferris State in the West Regional. Eyssimont finished his freshman season with 14 goals and 33 points. That June, the Los Angeles Kings of the National Hockey League (NHL) selected him in the fifth round, 142nd overall, of the 2016 NHL Entry Draft.

As a sophomore during the 2016–17 college hockey season, Eyssimont had 14 goals and 30 points in 36 games. Prior to the 2017–18 season, Eyssimont suffered medical issues caused by dietary sensitivities. After being hospitalized for these issues, he adopted a gluten- and dairy-free diet. After overcoming the illness, Eyssimont scored 21 points in his first 19 games with St. Cloud, and he picked up in the final stretch of the season. He finished his junior season with 17 goals and 39 points in 39 games. In 115 games across three seasons of college ice hockey, Eyssimont finished with 45 goals and 57 assists.

Professional
After the Huskies were eliminated from the 2018 NCAA tournament, Eyssimont signed a two-year entry-level contract with the Kings. He spent those two seasons with the Ontario Reign, the Kings' American Hockey League (AHL) affiliate, where he recorded 22 goals and 49 points in 122 games. On October 5, 2020, Eyssimont signed a one-year contract extension with the Los Angeles club.

On July 28, 2021, the Winnipeg Jets signed Eyssimont to a two-year, two-way contract worth $1.5 million. He was assigned to the Manitoba Moose, the Jets' AHL affiliate, to begin the season. After scoring 15 goals and 35 points in 35 games for the Moose during the  season, Eyssimont was promoted to the NHL on April 11 as a fill-in for the injured Blake Wheeler. He was sent back down to the Moose on April 17.

During the  season, on November 6, 2022, Eyssimont was promoted to the NHL by the Jets after recording 9 points in as many games. Eyssimont remained on the Jets roster, featuring in 19 games and contributing with 1 goal and 5 points, before he was placed on waivers by Jets and subsequently claimed by the San Jose Sharks on January 6, 2023. On March 1, the Sharks traded Eyssimont to the Tampa Bay Lightning in exchange for Vladislav Namestnikov.

Personal life
Eyssimont has a twin sister named Anastasia, who planned to become a professional gymnast before suffering a career-ending elbow injury. She is now a professional skier skiing for Line Skis splitting her time between Salt Lake City and Carbondale.   After being diagnosed with Crohn's disease while attending St. Cloud State, Eyssimont has become involved with charity organizations offering support for the disease.

Career statistics

Awards and honors

References

External links
 
 St. Cloud State University biography

1996 births
Living people
American men's ice hockey centers
American men's ice hockey left wingers
Fargo Force players
Los Angeles Kings draft picks
Manitoba Moose players
Ontario Reign (AHL) players
People from Littleton, Colorado
San Jose Sharks players
Sioux Falls Stampede players
Sportspeople from Colorado
St. Cloud State Huskies men's ice hockey players
Tampa Bay Lightning players
Winnipeg Jets players